is a Japanese football player. He plays for MIO Biwako Shiga in the Japan Football League.

Playing career
Masato Osugi played for Sagawa Printing, Sagawa Shiga and Kamatamare Sanuki from 2005 to 2014. He moved to MIO Biwako Shiga in 2015.

Club statistics
Updated to 20 February 2018.

References

External links

1983 births
Living people
Hannan University alumni
Association football people from Hiroshima Prefecture
Japanese footballers
J2 League players
Japan Football League players
SP Kyoto FC players
Sagawa Shiga FC players
Kamatamare Sanuki players
MIO Biwako Shiga players
Association football defenders